The Naujosios Biržų žinios (literally: New Biržai news) was the weekly (first few months - bi-weekly)  on matters of society, politics and literature. It was published from 1941 to 1944. A total of 131 issues were published. It was the continuation of the  that was published from 1922 to 1933. From 16 January 1943 to 8 July 1944, the newspaper was published under the old title .

History 
It was published by the Lithuanian Activist Front. In its first issue on 19 July 1941, the newspaper greeted the Wehrmacht with: "" (translates to: We salute the victorious German Wehrmacht!). 

After the German invasion, the  wrote:After the Bolsheviks fled, a list of changes in street names was found in the executive committee of Biržai town, in which we find the following changes: the existing Gediminas street is renamed to Kapsukas, Martynas Yčas - , Officer  - Soviets,  - Kirov, Vytautas Avenue - Stalin's Avenue, Reformed - Komsomol, Shops - Internationale, Markets - Lenin's and others ... Angry tongues said that the city of Biržai itself will be named Kerbelgrad.Edited by Jonas Mekas (1941–1942), Julius Petronis, editor-in-chief Stasys Lipniūnas.

References

Sources

External links 

 Issues of the newspaper Naujosios Biržų žinios from 1941 to 1944.

Publications established in 1941
Publications disestablished in 1944
Defunct newspapers published in Lithuania
Lithuanian-language newspapers